Kennacraig is a hamlet situated on West Loch Tarbert, a  south west of Tarbert on the Kintyre peninsula, Argyll and Bute, in the west of Scotland.

Ferry terminal

Caledonian MacBrayne ferries sail from the terminal, on the rocky islet Eilean Ceann na Creige, to Port Ellen or Port Askaig on Islay, and also to Colonsay during the summer season.

Western Ferries started a car ferry to Islay from 7 April 1968 and CalMac took over in 1978, having previously used West Loch Tarbert.

References

External links

 Port Information, Calmac - website
 Ships of Calmac description and photos.

Villages in Kintyre